The SFAN II was a French motorglider built in the mid-1930s.

Specifications

See also

References

1930s French sport aircraft
Single-engined tractor aircraft
High-wing aircraft
Aircraft first flown in 1935